Sassa Jimenez (born December 17, 1987) is a Filipina fashion designer. She was selected as one of the presenters at the bi-annual Philippine Fashion Week. In 2009, she focused her "club glam" style towards "partyphiles" by using snakeskin and metallic. A report in Status Magazine suggested that she was moving away from her "signature pretty and sweet designs" and instead playing with leather, dark colors, and different silhouettes in 2012.

Early life
Her father serves as tourism secretary. She studied creative writing at the Ateneo de Manila University. Later, she studied at the Fashion Institute of Design and Merchandising in Los Angeles, California. She finished the course in a year and a half and graduated cum laude.

Career
In 2008, Jimenez began showcasing her designs at the Philippine Fashion Week. Her collection was described as "refreshing and feminine, with classic, clean lines and surprising twists", "a breath of fresh air", "too busy", "could have been purchased off the rack from local retail stores", "polished, sleek, and sexy", with a 1940s look.

References

1987 births
Filipino fashion designers
Filipino women fashion designers
Living people
People from Manila
Ateneo de Manila University alumni